Issinsky District is an administrative and municipal district (raion), one of the twenty-seven in Penza Oblast, Russia. It is located in the north of the oblast. Its administrative center is the urban locality (a work settlement) of Issa. Population: 11,157 (2010 Census);  The population of Issa accounts for 48.6% of the district's total population.

Notable residents 

Filipp Cherokmanov (1899–1978), Soviet Army lieutenant general, Hero of the Soviet Union, born in the village of Marovka

References

Notes

Sources

 
Districts of Penza Oblast